The Joy programming language in computer science is a purely functional programming language that was produced by Manfred von Thun of La Trobe University in Melbourne, Australia. Joy is based on composition of functions rather than lambda calculus. It has turned out to have many similarities to Forth, due not to design but to an independent evolution and convergence. It was also inspired by the function-level programming style of John Backus's FP.

How it works 

Joy is unusual among functional programming languages (except for function-level programming languages and some esoteric ones, such as Unlambda) in its lack of a lambda operator, and therefore lack of formal parameters. To illustrate this with a common example, here is how the square function might be defined in an imperative programming language (C):

int square(int x)
{
    return x * x;
}

The variable x is a parameter which is replaced by the argument to be squared when the function is called.

In a functional language (Scheme), the same function could be defined:

(define square
  (lambda (x) 
    (* x x)))

This is different in many ways, but it still uses the parameter x in the same way.

In Joy, the square function is defined:

 DEFINE square == dup * .

In Joy, everything is a function that takes a stack as an argument and returns a stack as a result. For instance, the numeral '5' does not represent an integer constant, but instead a short program that pushes the number 5 onto the stack.

 The dup operator simply duplicates the top element of the stack by pushing a copy of it.
 The * operator pops two numbers off the stack and pushes their product.

So the square function makes a copy of the top element, and then multiplies the two top elements of the stack, leaving the square of the original top element at the top of the stack, with no need for a formal parameter. This makes Joy concise, as illustrated by this definition of quicksort:

<nowiki>
 DEFINE qsort ==
   [small]
   []
   [uncons [>] split]
   [enconcat]
   binrec.
</nowiki>

"binrec" is one of Joy's many recursive combinators, implementing binary recursion. It expects four quoted programs on top of the stack which represent:

 the termination condition (if a list is "small" (1 or 0 elements) it is already sorted),
 what to do if the termination condition is met (in this case nothing),
 what to do by default (split the list into two halves by comparing each element with the pivot), and finally
 what to do at the end (insert the pivot between the two sorted halves).

Mathematical purity 
In Joy, the meaning function is a homomorphism from the syntactic monoid onto the semantic monoid. That is, the syntactic relation of concatenation of symbols maps directly onto the semantic relation of composition of functions. It is a homomorphism rather than an isomorphism, because it is onto but not one-to-one; that is, no symbol has more than one meaning, but some sequences of symbols have the same meaning (e.g. "dup +" and "2 *").

Joy is a concatenative programming language: "The concatenation of two programs denotes the composition of the functions denoted by the two programs".

Its library routines mirror those of ISO C, though the current implementation is not easily extensible with functions written in C.

See also 

 RPL
 Concatenative programming language

References

External links
 
 ZIP of Official Joy Programming Language Website (La Trobe University)
 Joy homepage mirror
 Compiled informative collection on Joy
 immediately executable Joy (GitHub-Archiv)
 
 
 
 
 mjoy, an interpreter in Delphi for machine drawing (Subset of Joy)

Programming languages
Concatenative programming languages
Stack-oriented programming languages
Functional languages
Academic programming languages
Programming languages created in 2001
2001 software
Dynamic programming languages
Dynamically typed programming languages
High-level programming languages